Viva Television Corporation is a Philippine television production company owned by Viva Communications.

History
Viva Communications ventured into television production in 1986 with The Sharon Cuneta Show. Cuneta's big screen success easily fueled her musical variety TV show to the top of the ratings where it stayed until mid-1997 (when she semi-retired).

Since then, Viva's television unit branched out into drama anthologies, action features and comedy for teens and yuppies. It became a significant player among free TV blocktimers and had successfully spun-off theatrical versions of its more popular youth-oriented shows.

In 2000, Viva Television acquired Vintage Enterprises (including the Vintage Television on IBC primetime block), making the Velez group being part of the Viva Entertainment group and changed its name to Viva TV as the primetime sports and entertainment block on IBC, at this time it also known as Viva-Vintage until 2003. At the same time, Viva TV launched the Philippine editions of Who Wants to Be a Millionaire?, hosted by Christopher de Leon, and The Weakest Link, hosted by Edu Manzano.

In 2002, Viva Television further enhanced its reputation as a star-maker and a trendsetter by producing and launching the highly successful talent search show: Star for a Night on IBC. The weekly program hosted by Regine Velasquez showcased the best among the young Filipino singing talents dressed up in a professional setting. This highly rated show led to the discovery of Sarah Geronimo and Mark Bautista, who are now established recording artists and TV/movie stars.

In 2003, Viva decided to not renew their blocktime agreement with IBC due to high blocktime costs and low ratings. In the same year, Viva co-produced with GMA Network another highly successful TV talent search program Search for a Star. This talent search program led to the discovery of Rachelle Ann Go and Raymond Manalo. Both are now established singing artists. Viva's talent search success also spawned similar program formats from the two major free TV stations in the country. In 2005, Viva became a co-producer of ABS-CBN's weekly talent search program Search for the Star in a Million. The program was envisioned to produce and discover another major singing star from among the country's best and brightest aspiring and young talents.

In 2006, Viva Television entered into a joint venture agreement with Prime Channel owner Apollo Global Corporation and became Viva Prime Channel. It lasted until 2011 when Viva sold back its stake in the joint-venture channel; Viva Prime was relaunched by Apollo Global as the Pinoy Xtreme channel.

In May 2011, Viva Television made a comeback to produce Viva classic blockbuster films to television with a Sunday afternoon series the 1980's remake of the film franchise Bagets with the teen-oriented show entitled Bagets: Just Got Lucky which replaced its teen romance anthology Luv Crazy on the revamped TV5 which showcases new television dramas competing with top Philippine broadcasting pioneers ABS-CBN and GMA Network. On the third quarter lineup of TV5 introduced the 1991 film franchise turned Primetime TV series Ang Utol Kong Hoodlum, which was pushed back due to shooting arrangements, which was supposed to be released on July 18, 2011 replacing the primetime series Babaeng Hampaslupa but was replaced by its first HD primetime drama Rod Santiago's The Sisters the series ended on September 13, 2011, Ang Utol Kung Hoodlum was released on September 16, 2011, currently airing it starred Robin Padilla and Vina Morales in the original film and sequel, but now played by JC de Vera and Jasmine Curtis-Smith. An upcoming project to be produced by VIVA Television is P. S. I Love You a 1981 blockbuster film which starred Real to Reel life sweethearts Gabby Concepcion and Sharon Cuneta which tackles issues surrounding two young lovers, played by Bagets cast mates AJ Muhlach and Nadine Lustre, Gabby Concepcion will also be part of the cast and Dina Bonnevie it is confirmed to be under production and filming.

On July 16, 2012, Viva Television revived Viva TV after a 9-year hiatus, the channel was relaunched as the new 24 hour all-Filipino general Entertainment channel on cable and satellite, along with the launch of new programming except Popstar Diaries, which is the only Viva-produced program from Pinoy Box Office.

Since late 2015, Viva Television has made intermittent partnerships with TV5 for programs for its blocktime line up after the dissolution of the latter's in-house entertainment department.

Shows produced

Upcoming

References

Viva Entertainment subsidiaries
Television production companies of the Philippines
Mass media companies established in 1986
 
Companies based in Pasig
1986 establishments in the Philippines